Rocket & Groot is an American animated television series based on the characters Rocket Raccoon and Groot who appeared in comics published by Marvel Comics. It premiered on March 10, 2017, on Disney XD. The series is created by Marvel Animation and Passion Studios with animation done by Fortiche Production in France.

References

2017 American television series debuts
2017 American television series endings
2010s American animated television series
American children's animated superhero television series
Animated television series based on Marvel Comics
Disney XD original programming
Marvel Animation
Television series about raccoons